Čajetina is a small town and municipality located in the Zlatibor District of western Serbia. According to the 2011 census results, the municipality has 14,745 inhabitants. One of the most notable settlements in the municipality of Čajetina is a popular tourist town of Zlatibor.

Climate
Čajetina has a humid continental climate (Köppen climate classification: Dfb).

Settlements
Aside from the town of Čajetina, the municipality comprises the following settlements:

 Alin Potok
 Branešci
 Golovo
 Gostilje
 Dobroselica
 Drenova
 Željine
 Zlatibor
 Jablanica
 Kriva Reka
 Ljubiš
 Mačkat
 Mušvete
 Rakovica
 Rožanstvo
 Rudine
 Sainovina
 Semegnjevo
 Sirogojno
 Stublo
 Tripkova
 Trnava
 Šljivovica

Demographics

According to the 2011 census results, the municipality has 14,745 inhabitants.

Ethnic groups
The ethnic composition of the municipality:

Economy
The following table gives a preview of total number of registered people employed in legal entities per their core activity (as of 2018):

Gallery

Twin towns
 Herceg Novi, Montenegro
 Lefkimmi, Greece
 Nazarje, Slovenia
 Šamac, Bosnia and Herzegovina

References

External links

 

Zlatibor
Populated places in Zlatibor District
Municipalities and cities of Šumadija and Western Serbia